Twin Obscenity is a Norwegian death/black metal band. They borrowed their name from Zhar and Lloigor, collectively known as the Twin Obscenities, in the Cthulhu Mythos.

History
Discussions about starting a band (which later became Twin Obscenity) started in 1989 with drummer Knut Næsje, who went to the same primary school as bassist Jo-Arild Tønnessen. Twin Obscenity was founded in 1991 when, in high school, singer/guitarist/keyboardist Atle Wiig met Tønnessen, who had previously been playing with Naesje. Over the next few years they recorded three demo tapes.

Twin Obscenity's debut album, Where Light Touches None, was released in the summer of ‘97 on the Norwegian label Head Not Found. The group toured Europe after the album's release. After the band signed to Century Media Records in the beginning of 1998 they recorded their second album, For Blood, Honor and Soil.

Tønnessen, who was born in Stavanger, graduated as a software engineer in 1997, and has worked in the field since. He is married and has three children.

Jo Arild and Knut Næsje together with singer Remi S. formed 2nd Insanity in 2017. 2nd Insanity is scheduled to release 4 singles in Januar/February 2019.

Members
Atle Wiig - vocals, guitar
Jo Arild Tønnessen  - bass.
Knut Næsje - drums
Steffen Simenstad  - vocals (Gehenna (band), ex-Forlorn)
Tonje Ettesvold - vocals

Former members
Alexander Twiss (1997–1998) - guitars
Mona Undheim Skottene (1997–1998) - keyboards, vocals

Discography
Behind the Castle Walls (Demo, 1993)
Ruins (Demo, 1993)
Revelations Of Glaaki (Demo, 1995)
Where Light Touches None (Full-length, Head Not Found Records, 1997)
For Blood, Honor and Soil (Full-length, Century Media, 1999)
Bloodstone (Full-length, Century Media, 2001)

References

External links 
 Twin Obscenity @ MySpace

Norwegian viking metal musical groups
Norwegian black metal musical groups
Norwegian blackened death metal musical groups
Musical groups established in 1991
1991 establishments in Norway
Musical groups from Stavanger